Hypsopygia rubidalis is a species of snout moth in the genus Hypsopygia. It was described by Michael Denis and Ignaz Schiffermüller in 1775. It is found from Spain and France to Russia.

The wingspan is about 25 mm.

References

Moths described in 1775
Pyralini
Moths of Europe